Doyleston is a minor Canterbury town in the South Island of New Zealand. It was named after Joseph Hastings Doyle, a publican from Christchurch who moved to the locality.
Doyleston promised to be one of the main townships in the Ellesmere area, but before long Leeston overtook it and some businesses moved there. Doyleston had a school for many years, but it consolidated with Leeston School in the late 1930s.

Doyleston featured a hall on the main street (the second on the site), but partly due to a car crash it was pulled down, making way for new housing. Doyleston's main attraction now is Osborne Park, which has been the centre for junior football in Ellesmere for a number of years.

Demographics
It is part of the Irwell statistical area. 

Doyleston had a population of 324 at the 2018 New Zealand census, an increase of 12 people (3.8%) since the 2013 census, and an increase of 75 people (30.1%) since the 2006 census. There were 120 households. There were 174 males and 147 females, giving a sex ratio of 1.18 males per female, with 72 people (22.2%) aged under 15 years, 36 (11.1%) aged 15 to 29, 186 (57.4%) aged 30 to 64, and 27 (8.3%) aged 65 or older.

Ethnicities were 93.5% European/Pākehā, 10.2% Māori, 0.9% Pacific peoples, 1.9% Asian, and 1.9% other ethnicities (totals add to more than 100% since people could identify with multiple ethnicities).

Although some people objected to giving their religion, 61.1% had no religion, 26.9% were Christian, 0.9% were Hindu and 1.9% had other religions.

Of those at least 15 years old, 24 (9.5%) people had a bachelor or higher degree, and 51 (20.2%) people had no formal qualifications. The employment status of those at least 15 was that 153 (60.7%) people were employed full-time, 33 (13.1%) were part-time, and 3 (1.2%) were unemployed.

Notable people
 

Laurel Amy Eva Campbell (1902–1971), racehorse trainer

References

External links 
 Doyleston at the Selwyn District Council

Selwyn District
Populated places in Canterbury, New Zealand